Anderson Peak is a summit in Alberta, Canada.

Description

Anderson Peak is a  mountain located in Waterton Lakes National Park of the Canadian Rockies. Anderson Peak was named after Samuel Anderson (1839–1881), a British army surveyor who helped map the US-Canada border. The mountain's toponym was officially adopted in 1928 by the Geographical Names Board of Canada. Precipitation runoff from Anderson Peak drains to Waterton River via Bauerman and Blakiston creeks.

Geology
Like other mountains in Waterton Lakes National Park, Anderson Peak is composed of sedimentary rock laid down during the Precambrian to Jurassic periods. Formed in shallow seas, this sedimentary rock was pushed east and over the top of younger Cretaceous period rock during the Laramide orogeny.

Climate
Based on the Köppen climate classification, Anderson Peak is located in a subarctic climate zone with cold, snowy winters, and mild summers. Winter temperatures can drop below −20 °C with wind chill factors below −30 °C.

See also
Geology of Alberta

References

External links
 Anderson Peak weather forecast
 Parks Canada web site: Waterton Lakes National Park

Two-thousanders of Alberta
Canadian Rockies
Waterton Lakes National Park